University College of Bahrain (UCB) is a private university located in Bahrain established in 2002. The university offers Programs in Business administration, Information Technology, and Graphic Design in addition to programs at Graduate level (MBA)

Accreditation

UCB is accredited and licensed by the Ministry of Education (Bahrain), UCB also receives academic support from the Regional External Programs / American University of Beirut.

Academic programs

Undergraduate programs

Business
B.Sc. in Accounting
B.Sc. in Finance
B.Sc. in Islamic finance
B.Sc. in Engineering Management
B.Sc. in Management
B.Sc. in Marketing

Information Technology
B.Sc. in MIS
B.Sc. in Software Development
B.Sc. in Computer Science

Media & Communication
B.Sc. in Graphic Design
B.Sc. in Multimedia
B.Sc. in Public Relations

Graduate & Executive
Evening MBA
Executive Development
MBA Islamic Finance

Executives
Sh. Dr. Khalid Bin Mohammed Al Khalifa (Founder, President and Vice Chairman of the Board University College of Bahrain & Lightspeed Communications)
Sh. Saeeda A. Al Khalifa (Vice President of Administration)
Sh. Ebrahim Bin Khalid Al Khalifa (executive director, Administration & Finance)
Sh. Ali Bin Khalid Al Khalifa (executive director, Planning & Development)

Notable alumni 

 Yara Salman - food services and medical entrepreneur.

References

External links
Instructor Web
Blackboard Learning System
University Library Guide
UCB Student Information System
UCB Mail
The UCB students forum.
UCB Alumni Registration
Become a UCB fan
Follow UCB on Twitter

Universities in Bahrain
Educational institutions established in 2002
2002 establishments in Bahrain